The Lim (Serbian Cyrillic: Лим) is a river that flows through Montenegro, Serbia and Bosnia and Herzegovina and is  long. It is also the right and the longest tributary of the Drina.

Montenegro and Serbia 

The Lim rises below Maglić peak in the Kuči area of eastern Montenegro, very close to the Albanian border, under the name of Vrmoša. Its source is only few kilometers away from the source of the Tara river, but the two rivers go in opposite directions: the Tara to the north-west and the Vrmoša to the east, and after only few kilometers it crosses over to Albania. Passing through Prokletije mountains and the village of Vermosh, it re-enters Montenegro under the name of Grnčar. Receiving the Vruje stream from Ali Pasha's Wellsprings from the right at Gusinje, it continues as Ljuča for a few more kilometers where it empties into the Lake Plav, creating small delta. It flows out of the lake to the north, next to the high mountain Visitor, under the name Lim for the remaining .

It passes through Murino, continuing generally to the north through areas of Vasojevići, Gornji Kolašin, Donji Kolašin and Komarani, the Tivran gorge and the cities of Andrijevica, Berane, Bijelo Polje, Resnik and Nedakusi, entering Serbia between villages of Dobrakovo and Gostun. It receives the right tributaries of Lješnica (between the villages of Poda and Skakavac) and Bistrica (near the border) and left tributary of Ljuboviđa, near Bijelo Polje.

Serbia and Bosnia and Herzegovina 

In the border area, the Lim carved a long gorge Kumanička klisura, between the mountains of Lisa (in Montenegro) and Ozren (in Serbia). Lim continues between the mountains of Jadovnik, Pobijenik and Zlatar, and runs through the northern part of the Sandžak area (or Raška oblast). Upstream of Priboj, the river is dammed by the hydro power plant "Potpeć", creating Potpeć Reservoir. The villages of Garčanica and Lučice and the towns of Brodarevo, Prijepolje, Pribojska Banja and Priboj. After Priboj it turns north-west and enters Bosnia and Herzegovina, but only for a few kilometers when it flows back to Serbia and then again to Bosnia at Rudo. In Bosnia and Herzegovina, Lim flows between the mountains of Bić, Javorje and Vučevica from the south, and the Varda mountain from the north, before it empties into the Drina near the village of Međeđa. The lowest section of the river is flooded by the Višegrad Reservoir, created by the Višegrad hydroelectrical power plant on the Drina.

Characteristics 
Lim belongs to the Black Sea drainage basin through Drina, Sava and Danube.

It receives many smaller streams in Montenegro and Bosnia and Herzegovina, however, the two most important are its major right tributaries in Serbia, the Uvac and the Mileševa river.

Three hypotheses exist about the origin of its name:
 Latin origin derived from the word limes, meaning border;
 Celtic origin from the root llyn or llym, meaning water or lake. This version was supported by Miloš Crnjanski in the section Celts in our rivers of his book British-Balkan connections: Connections in prehistory;
 Albanian origin from the root lymë, meaning river

Polimlje 
The fertile valley of the river is called Polimlje (Полимље), meaning "Lim valley". It represents area around composite river valley, made of several gorges and depressions. The valley is divided in three large parts, Montenegrin, Stari Vlah and Bosnian.

It is important agricultural region, especially for cultivating fruits and stockbreeding. It is also an important route for both the road and railways from Serbia to Montenegro and Adriatic coast, most notably, the Belgrade-Bar railway. Industry is not much developed (smaller industrial centers are Berane, Bijelo Polje and Prijepolje), except for heavily industrialized Priboj. Most use of the river has Serbian electricity production, with power station Potpeć being constructed and several more stations on the Lim's major tributary, the Uvac.

Despite the potentials, the entire area the Lim flows through is undeveloped and for decades highly depopulating.

Border dispute 
After breakup of Yugoslavia in 1991-1992, on the part of Lim's course entering and re-entering Serbia and Bosnia, several villages of Serbia remained physically cut off from the rest of the republic's territory. The governments in Belgrade and Sarajevo proposed an exchange of territories but no agreement was reached.

Lim River tragedy 
On 4 April 2004, around 10 PM, a bus carrying Bulgarian tourists (34 students and 16 adults) back to their native Svishtov from a trip to Dubrovnik in Croatia fell and sank in the river near the Serbian village of Gostun close to the border with Montenegro as the driver lost control over it during a turn on a mountain road. Twelve children died, the other 38 people being saved with the aid of the locals.

See also 
List of rivers of Bosnia and Herzegovina
List of rivers of Montenegro
List of rivers of Serbia

References 

 Mala Prosvetina Enciklopedija, Third edition (1985); Prosveta; 
 Jovan Đ. Marković (1990): Enciklopedijski geografski leksikon Jugoslavije; Svjetlost-Sarajevo;

External links 

Brodarevo, city built on river Lim

Rivers of Bosnia and Herzegovina
Rivers of Montenegro
Rivers of Serbia
Territorial disputes of Serbia
International rivers of Europe
Accursed Mountains